Jeffrey "Jeff" R. King (born May 15, 1975) is a former Republican member of the Kansas Senate, representing residents of Allen, Woodson, Anderson, Franklin, Coffey, Wilson, Montgomery, Elk, and Chautauqua counties in the 15th Senate district from 2011 until 2017. He was appointed to fill the unexpired term of Derek Schmidt in the Kansas Senate 15th district, following Schmidt's election as Kansas Attorney General. King assumed office in the Kansas Senate on January 10, 2011, resigning from the House, effective the same day. He previously served in the Kansas House of Representatives, first holding office in 2007. In 2016, the American Conservative Union gave him a lifetime evaluation of 79%.

King earned his Bachelor of Arts in international relations and economy from Brown University, Master of Science in agricultural economics from Cambridge University, and J.D. from Yale Law School.

Prior to his election he has worked for the U.S. Department of Agriculture, as a private practice attorney, and as a law clerk for Chief Judge Deanell Reece Tacha on the U.S. Court of Appeals for the Tenth Circuit.

Committee membership
Senator King currently serves on the following legislative committees:
Confirmation Oversight
Corrections and Juvenile Justice
Interstate Cooperation
Joint Committee on Prisons, Investments, and Benefits (Vice-chair)
Judiciary
Senate Select Committee on Kansas Public Employees Retirement System (KPERS) (Chair)
Transportation

Major donors
The top 5 donors to King's 2008 campaign were from professional organizations:
1. Kansas Medical Society 	$1,250 	
2. Kansans for Lifesaving Cures 	$1,000 	
3. Koch Industries 	$1,000 	
4. Kansas Contractors Assoc 	$1,000
5. Kansas Insurance Agents 	$600

References

External links
 Kansas Legislature - Jeff King
 State Surge - Legislative profile
 Project Vote Smart profile
 Kansas Votes profile
 Follow the Money campaign contributions:
 2006, 2008

Living people
1975 births
People from Independence, Kansas
Republican Party Kansas state senators
Republican Party members of the Kansas House of Representatives
21st-century American politicians
Brown University alumni
Alumni of the University of Cambridge
Yale Law School alumni